Space Hulk is a turn-based tactics video game developed by Danish studio Full Control and released on 15 August 2013. It is based on the tabletop game of the same name by Games Workshop.  It features the Blood Angels Chapter of the Space Marines battling grotesque aliens known as Genestealers. A follow-up game, Space Hulk: Ascension, was released in 2014.

Plot 

The plot of this table-top game is you have a squad of 2 assaulters, 1 force commander,1 flamer and a librarian. the goal is to get to the shuttle at the exit while genestealers and tyranids block your path. A narrator explains each mission before starting.

Gameplay 

The gameplay is based heavily on the 4th edition of the tabletop game. The game is turn based and uses dice rolls. At each turn there is a limited number of action points to direct your squad. Extra action points can be earned from a dice roll. The game allows for undoing the last made action. The multiplayer supports hotseat mode.

Reception 

Space Hulk has received generally mixed reviews. Metacritic gave it a weighted average score of 58 out of 100 based on 22 reviews, with most reviewers citing a lack of polish and a too stringent adherence to the tabletop game rules.

Eurogamer's Dan Whitehead viewed the game as an exercise in nostalgia, faithful to the design of the original board game without innovating in any way, "more awestruck tribute than actual adaptation."

Rob Zacny of IGN said that the game's main problem was that "its designers couldn't let it deviate from or build on the simple rules of a board game experience that lacks tactical depth."  It was considered, nevertheless to be "a fine game, a pleasant diversion."

References

External links 
 
 

2013 video games
Android (operating system) games
Full Control games
Games Workshop games
IOS games
Linux games
MacOS games
Multiplayer hotseat games
Turn-based strategy video games
PlayStation 3 games
PlayStation Network games
PlayStation Vita games
Video games based on board games
Video games developed in Denmark
Warhammer 40,000 video games
Wii U eShop games
Windows games